"Just watch me" is a phrase made famous by Canadian Prime Minister Pierre Trudeau on October 13, 1970, during the October Crisis.  The term is still regularly used in Canadian political discussion.

Trudeau, who had in previous years been a strong proponent of civil liberties, spoke of the need for drastic action to restore order in Quebec.  When questioned by CBC reporter Tim Ralfe on how far he would go in the suspension of civil liberties to maintain order, Trudeau replied "Well, just watch me."

Three days later, he invoked the War Measures Act, which led to police action against many Quebec dissidents and great public controversy.

Just Watch Me: Trudeau and the '70s Generation is the title of a 1999 documentary by Catherine Annau. The phrase has also been the title of several biographies of Trudeau, e.g., Larry Zolf's Just Watch Me: Remembering Pierre Trudeau (1984); Ron Coleman's Just Watch Me: Trudeau's Tragic Legacy (2003); and the 2nd volume of John English's biography, Just Watch Me: The Life of Pierre Elliott Trudeau, 1968–2000 (2009).

Excerpt from interview 
The following is a partial transcript of the impromptu interview between Tim Ralfe of the CBC and Trudeau.

Contemporary usage

In March 2013, Trudeau's son Justin, while running for the Liberal Party leadership, evoked his father's memory during his campaign by repeating this phrase.  It was in answer to a fellow airplane passenger's question in a handwritten note, asking Justin if he could beat Conservative Prime Minister Stephen Harper.  The comment sparked a frenzy on Twitter, as well as mixed reaction from several commentators, some of whom saw the quote as a politically sensitive and risky one in Quebec. Two years later, Justin Trudeau became Prime Minister of Canada, beating Harper in federal election by a significant margin.

On September 12, 2021, Justin Trudeau said that NDP leader Jagmeet Singh could not go after Canada's wealthiest people with "unlimited zeal" in response to his party's campaign promise to tax the rich. Singh responded on Twitter with the line "Just watch me."

In response to the Freedom Convoy protests in 2022, some commentators called for Justin Trudeau to have a "just watch me" moment of his own. The younger Trudeau later invoked the Emergencies Act for the first time in Canadian history.

See also
Trudeaumania
Trudeauism
Fuddle duddle
Just society

References 

1970 in Canada
English phrases
Political history of Canada
Canadian political phrases
Pierre Trudeau
October Crisis
Human rights in Canada
Political debates